Mouth to Mouth is a 2005 Swedish film directed by Björn Runge.

Cast 
Peter Andersson as Mats
Marie Richardson as Ewa
Sofia Westberg as Vera
Magnus Krepper as Morgan
Anton Jarlros Gry as Joel
Magdalena Jansson as Helen
Liv Omsén as Susanne
Marie Göranzon as Ewa's mother Monica
Ingvar Hirdwall as Mats' father John
Ann Petrén as Lisbeth
Pernilla August as Leyla
Camilla Larsson as Helen's mother
Fyr Thorvald Strömberg as Helen's father
Anna Pettersson as Veronica
Malin Arvidsson as Ewa's colleague Petra
Malin Lindström as Ewa's colleague Angelica
Jan Coster as Caretaker
Ola Hedén as The john at the parking lot
Laszlo Hago as Vera's costumer at Morgan's flat #1
Leif Andrée as Joel's teacher Jörgen
Ida Renner as Deb
Francisco Sobrado as Leo
Erika Elfwencrona as Suss
Finn Palm as Henke
Shahryar Ghanbari as Amir
Ellen Sjöö as Anki
Patrik Helin as Café guest
Robert Somfai as The corpse
Josefin Simonsson as Morgan's tenant

Soundtrack 
Gabriel Kofod-Hansen – "Softar" (Written by Gabriel Kofod-Hansen)
Duke Johnsson and the Ted Brothers – "I'm a Cowboy" (Written by Otto Degerman)
Ada Berger – "Kom till mig" (Written by Tobias Hylander and Ada Berger)
Ulf Dageby – "Mun mot mun, Soffan" (Written by Ulf Dageby)

Awards and nominations 
Magnus Krepper was awarded a Guldbagge Award for Best Supporting Actor, at the 41st Guldbagge Awards. Other Guldbagge nominations was Peter Andersson for Best Actor, Anders Bohman for Best Cinematography, Björn Runge for Best Director and Best Screenplay, Clas Gunnarsson for Best Film, and Sofia Westberg for Best Supporting Actress. The film was also nominated for a Crystal Globe at the Karlovy Vary International Film Festival.

External links 

2005 films
2005 drama films
2000s Swedish-language films
Films directed by Björn Runge
Films about runaways
Swedish drama films
2000s Swedish films